Trigger (July 4, 1934 – July 3, 1965) was a  palomino horse made famous in American Western films with his owner and rider, cowboy star Roy Rogers.

Pedigree
The original Trigger, named Golden Cloud, was born in San Diego, California. Though often mistaken for a Tennessee Walking Horse, his sire was a Thoroughbred and his dam a grade (unregistered) mare that, like Trigger, was a palomino. Movie director William Witney, who directed Roy and Trigger in many of their movies, claimed a slightly different lineage, that his sire was a "registered" palomino stallion (though no known palomino registry existed at the time of Trigger's birth) and his dam was by a Thoroughbred and out of a "cold-blood" mare. Horses other than Golden Cloud also portrayed "Trigger" over the years, none of which was related to Golden Cloud; the two most prominent were palominos known as "Little Trigger" and "Trigger Jr." (a Tennessee Walking Horse listed as "Allen's Gold Zephyr" in the Tennessee Walking Horse registry).  Though Trigger remained a stallion his entire life, he was never bred and has no descendants. Rogers used "Trigger Jr."/"Allen's Golden Zephyr", though, at stud for many years, and the horse named "Triggerson" that actor Val Kilmer led on stage as a tribute to Rogers and his cowboy peers during the Academy Awards show in March 1999 was reportedly a grandson of Trigger Jr.

Film career

Golden Cloud made an early appearance as the mount of Maid Marian, played by Olivia de Havilland in The Adventures of Robin Hood (1938). A short while later, when Roy Rogers was preparing to make his first movie in a starring role, he was offered a choice of five rented "movie" horses to ride and chose Golden Cloud. Rogers bought him eventually in 1943 and renamed him Trigger for his quickness of both foot and mind.  Trigger learned 150 trick cues and could walk 50 ft (15 m) on his hind legs (according to sources close to Rogers). They were said to have run out of places to cue Trigger. Trigger became such a ham that as soon as he heard applause, he would start bowing and ruin that trick. He could sit in a chair, sign his name "X" with a pencil, and lie down for a nap and cover himself with a blanket. Rogers' most carefully guarded trade secret was to get Trigger housebroken.  "Spending as much time as he does in hotels, theaters, and hospitals, this ability comes in might handy and it's conceded by most trainers to be Trigger's greatest accomplishment." —Glenn Randall, wrangler with Hudkins Stables.

His horse was so important to Rogers that when he purchased a "Best Wishes for the New Year" advertisement in Variety, he signed it "Roy Rogers and Trigger". Trigger was ridden by Rogers in many of his motion pictures, becoming much loved by the youthful audience that saw him on film and in Rogers' 1950s television series with his wife, Dale Evans, who rode her trusty buckskin Quarter Horse, Buttermilk.

Trigger became the most famous horse in film entertainment, even having his own Dell comic book recounting his exploits.

Roy Rogers made many personal appearances with Trigger in tow. More than once, he escorted him up three or four flights of stairs at hospitals to visit with sick children, according to his autobiography Happy Trails.

Kilt
While appearing in a show at the Glasgow Empire on Sunday 14 February 1954, Trigger was presented with a kilt, the material being Dress Stewart Tartan. The kilt was presented by Jim Gordon of Thomas Gordon and Sons, and was made by Williamina McLauchlan.

Death and legacy

After the original Trigger (Golden Cloud) died in 1965 at Rogers's new ranch in Apple Valley, California, Rogers arranged for Everett Wilkens of Bischoff's Taxidermy in Los Angeles (now Bischoff's Taxidermy and Animal FX in Burbank, California) to preserve and mount the horse. The hide was professionally stretched over a foam likeness of Trigger, and the resulting mount was put on display in the Roy Rogers-Dale Evans Museum when it opened in Apple Valley in 1967. The mount was later moved with the museum to Victorville, California, in 1976, and then to Branson, Missouri in 2003.

A 24-ft (7 m) replica of a rearing Trigger was produced to sit atop the Roy Rogers Museum in Victorville. The 1,300-lb (600 kg) replica could be seen from the freeway and served as a landmark until the museum closed and moved to Branson. When the fiberglass replica of Trigger was being made, Rogers was approached by the owners of the Denver Broncos. He allowed another statue to be made for them, then broke the mold. "Bucky the Bronco", Trigger's twin, stands above the south scoreboard of Empower Field at Mile High (formerly Broncos Stadium).

After the museum's closing in 2010, its contents were placed at public auction on July 14–15, 2010 at Christie's auction house in New York City. Trigger's preserved remains sold for $266,500 to television channel RFD-TV, which plans to start a Western museum. Bob Tinsley, a Victorville developer who built Roy Rogers's home in nearby Apple Valley, bought the fiberglass replica in April 2010, and plans to make the statue a part of historic Apple Valley Village. "I just couldn't see letting him go anywhere else," he explained. As of 2018, Chet Hitt and Bob Tinsley, installed Trigger's statue at the entrance of the Spirit River Center located on Apple Valley Road.

In the 2022 film Nope, The character of Ricky "Jupe" Park makes mention of training a horse named Trigger at his Western-themed park. A prominent theme in the film is the use of animals in film productions, making this a likely nod to the original Trigger.

Selected filmography
 The Adventures of Robin Hood (1938)
 Man from Cheyenne (1942)
 San Fernando Valley (1944)
 Lake Placid Serenade (1944)
 Don't Fence Me In (1945)
 Along the Navajo Trail (1945)
 My Pal Trigger (1946)
 Roll on Texas Moon (1946)
 Under Nevada Skies (1946)
 The Gay Ranchero (1948)
 Under California Stars (1948)
 Melody Time (1948)
 The Golden Stallion (1949)
 Son of Paleface (1952)

See also
 Buttermilk (horse)
 Wonder Horses
 List of historical horses

References

Bibliography

External links
 Roy Rogers and Dale Evans Museum
 
 
 Auction information at Christie's (July 14–15, 2010)

1934 animal births
1965 animal deaths
Horse actors
Horses in film and television
Palomino horses
Individual taxidermy exhibits
Roy Rogers